The Chelsea Physic Garden was established as the Apothecaries' Garden in London, England, in 1673 by the Worshipful Society of Apothecaries to grow plants to be used as medicines. This four acre physic garden, the term here referring to the science of healing, is among the oldest botanical gardens in Britain, after the University of Oxford Botanic Garden. Its rock garden is the oldest in Europe devoted to alpine plants and Mediterranean plants. The largest fruiting olive tree in Britain is there, protected by the garden's heat-trapping high brick walls, along with what is doubtless the world's northernmost grapefruit growing outdoors. Jealously guarded during the tenure of the Worshipful Society of Apothecaries, the garden became a registered charity in 1983 and was opened to the general public for the first time.

The garden is a member of the London Museums of Health & Medicine. It is also Grade I listed in the Register of Historic Parks and Gardens of Special Historic Interest in England by English Heritage.

History

The Worshipful Society of Apothecaries initially established the garden on a leased site of Sir John Danvers' well-established garden in Chelsea, London. This house, called Danvers House, adjoined the mansion that had once been the house of Sir Thomas More. Danvers House was pulled down in 1696 to make room for Danvers Street.

That initiated the golden age of the Chelsea Physic Garden under the direction of Philip Miller (1722–1770), when it became the world's most richly stocked botanic garden. Its seed-exchange programme was established following a visit in 1682 from Paul Hermann, a Dutch botanist connected with the Hortus Botanicus Leiden and has lasted until the present day. The seed exchange programme's most notable act may have been the introduction of cotton into the colony of Georgia and more recently, the worldwide spread of the Madagascar periwinkle (Catharanthus roseus).

Isaac Rand, a member and a fellow of the Royal Society, published a condensed catalogue of the garden in 1730, Index plantarum officinalium, quas ad materiae medicae scientiam promovendam, in horto Chelseiano. Elizabeth Blackwell's A Curious Herbal (1737–39) was illustrated partly from specimens taken from the Chelsea Physic Garden. Sir Joseph Banks worked with the head gardener and curator John Fairbairn during the 1780–1814 period. Fairbairn specialized in growing and cultivating plants from around the world.

Parts of the garden have been lost to road development – the river bank during 1874 construction of the Chelsea Embankment on the north bank of the River Thames, and a strip of the garden to allow widening of Royal Hospital Road. What remains is a  patch in the heart of London.

As of 2020, the chairman of the trust that manages the garden is Michael Prideaux. His predecessor was Sarah Troughton. The garden director is Sue Medway. As of 2020 the garden is raising funds to restore the historic glasshouses on the site.

Current garden
As of October 2017, the garden included 5,000 plants, in areas such as:
The Garden of Medicinal Plants
The Pharmaceutical Garden, with plants arranged according to the ailment they are used to treat
The Garden of World Medicine, with medicinal plants arranged by the culture which uses them
The Garden of Edible and Useful Plants
The World Woodland Garden

Associated people

References
Notes

Further reading

External links

1673 establishments in England
Botanical gardens in London
England
Gardens in London
Parks and open spaces in the Royal Borough of Kensington and Chelsea
Herb gardens
Museums in the Royal Borough of Kensington and Chelsea
Medical museums in London
Chelsea, London
Grade I listed parks and gardens in London